In mathematics, a modular form is a (complex) analytic function on the upper half-plane satisfying a certain kind of functional equation with respect to the group action of the modular group, and also satisfying a growth condition. The theory of modular forms therefore belongs to complex analysis but the main importance of the theory has traditionally been in its connections with number theory. Modular forms appear in other areas, such as algebraic topology, sphere packing, and string theory.

A modular function is a function that is invariant with respect to the modular group, but without the condition that  be holomorphic in the upper half-plane (among other requirements). Instead, modular functions are meromorphic (that is, they are holomorphic on the complement of a set of isolated points, which are poles of the function).

Modular form theory is a special case of the more general theory of automorphic forms which are functions defined on Lie groups which transform nicely with respect to the action of certain discrete subgroups, generalizing the example of the modular group .

General definition of modular forms 
In general, given a subgroup  of finite index, called an arithmetic group, a modular form of level  and weight  is a holomorphic function  from the upper half-plane such that the following two conditions are satisfied:1. (automorphy condition) For any  there is the equality 

2. (growth condition) For any  the function  is bounded for  where  and the function  is identified with the matrix  (The identification of such functions with such matrices causes composition of such functions to correspond to matrix multiplication.) In addition, it is called a cusp form if it satisfies the following growth condition:3. (cuspidal condition)  For any  the function  as

As sections of a line bundle 
Modular forms can also be interpreted as sections of a specific line bundle on modular varieties. For  a modular form of level  and weight  can be defined as an element ofwhere  is a canonical line bundle on the modular curveThe dimensions of these spaces of modular forms can be computed using the Riemann–Roch theorem.

Modular forms for SL(2, Z)

Standard definition 
A modular form of weight  for the modular group

is a complex-valued function  on the upper half-plane  satisfying the following three conditions: 

Remarks: 
 The weight  is typically a positive integer.
 For odd , only the zero function can satisfy the second condition.
 The third condition is also phrased by saying that  is "holomorphic at the cusp", a terminology that is explained below. Explicitly, the condition means that there exist some  such that , meaning  is bounded above some horizontal line.
 The second condition for 
 
reads

respectively. Since  and  generate the modular group , the second condition above is equivalent to these two equations. 
 Since , modular forms are periodic functions, with period , and thus have a Fourier series.

Definition in terms of lattices or elliptic curves

The key idea in proving the equivalence of the two definitions is that such a function  is determined, because of the second condition, by its values on lattices of the form , where .

Examples 

I. Eisenstein series

The simplest examples from this point of view are the Eisenstein series.

Then  is a modular form of weight . For   we have

and

II. Theta functions of even unimodular lattices

The so-called theta function

converges when Im(z) > 0, and as a consequence of the Poisson summation formula can be shown to be a modular form of weight . We call this lattice . When , this is the lattice generated by the roots in the root system called E8. Because there is only one modular form of weight 8 up to scalar multiplication,

John Milnor observed that the 16-dimensional tori obtained by dividing  by these two lattices are consequently examples of compact Riemannian manifolds which are isospectral but not isometric (see Hearing the shape of a drum.)

III. The modular discriminant

The Dedekind eta function is defined as

where q is the square of the nome. Then the modular discriminant  is a modular form of weight 12. The presence of 24 is related to the fact that the Leech lattice has 24 dimensions. This was confirmed by the work of Eichler, Shimura, Kuga, Ihara, and Pierre Deligne as a result of Deligne's proof of the Weil conjectures, which were shown to imply Ramanujan's conjecture.

The second and third examples give some hint of the connection between modular forms and classical questions in number theory, such as representation of integers by quadratic forms and the partition function. The crucial conceptual link between modular forms and number theory is furnished by the theory of Hecke operators, which also gives the link between the theory of modular forms and representation theory.

Modular functions
When the weight k is zero, it can be shown using Liouville's theorem that the only modular forms are constant functions. However, relaxing the requirement that f be holomorphic leads to the notion of modular functions. A function f : H → C is called modular iff it satisfies the following properties:

 f is meromorphic in the open upper half-plane H.
 For every integer matrix  in the modular group , .
 As pointed out above, the second condition implies that f is periodic, and therefore has a Fourier series. The third condition is that this series is of the form 
   

This is also referred to as the q-expansion of f (q-expansion principle). The coefficients  are known as the Fourier coefficients of f, and the number m is called the order of the pole of f at i∞. This condition is called "meromorphic at the cusp", meaning that only finitely many negative-n coefficients are non-zero, so the q-expansion is bounded below, guaranteeing that it is meromorphic at q = 0. 

Sometimes a weaker definition of modular functions is used – under the alternative definition, it is sufficient that f be meromorphic in the open upper half-plane and that f be invariant with respect to a sub-group of the modular group of finite index. This is not adhered to in this article.

Another way to phrase the definition of modular functions is to use elliptic curves: every lattice Λ determines an elliptic curve C/Λ over C; two lattices determine isomorphic elliptic curves if and only if one is obtained from the other by multiplying by some non-zero complex number . Thus, a modular function can also be regarded as a meromorphic function on the set of isomorphism classes of elliptic curves. For example, the j-invariant j(z) of an elliptic curve, regarded as a function on the set of all elliptic curves, is a modular function. More conceptually, modular functions can be thought of as functions on the moduli space of isomorphism classes of complex elliptic curves.

A modular unit is a modular function whose poles and zeroes are confined to the cusps.

Modular forms for more general groups
The functional equation, i.e., the behavior of f with respect to  can be relaxed by requiring it only for matrices in smaller groups.

The Riemann surface G\H∗
Let  be a subgroup of  that is of finite index. The quotient topological space G\H can be shown to be a Hausdorff space. Typically it is not compact, but can be compactified by adding a finite number of points called cusps. This yields a compact topological space G\H∗. What is more, it can be endowed with the structure of a Riemann surface, which allows one to speak of holo- and meromorphic functions.

Important examples are, for any positive integer N, either one of the congruence subgroups

The geometry of G\H∗ can be understood by studying fundamental domains for G, i.e. subsets D ⊂ H such that D intersects each orbit of the -action on H exactly once and such that the closure of D meets all orbits. For example, the genus of G\H∗ can be computed.

Definition
In case G = Γ0(N), they are also referred to as modular/cusp forms and functions of level N. For , this gives back the afore-mentioned definitions.

Consequences
The theory of Riemann surfaces can be applied to G\H∗ to obtain further information about modular forms and functions.

The modular functions constitute the field of functions of the Riemann surface, and hence form a field of transcendence degree one (over C). If a modular function f is not identically 0, then it can be shown that the number of zeroes of f is equal to the number of poles of f in the closure of the fundamental region RΓ.It can be shown that the field of modular function of level N (N ≥ 1) is generated by the functions j(z) and j(Nz).

Line bundles
The situation can be profitably compared to that which arises in the search for functions on the projective space P(V): in that setting, one would ideally like functions F on the vector space V which are polynomial in the coordinates of v ≠ 0 in V and satisfy the equation F(cv) = F(v) for all non-zero c. Unfortunately, the only such functions are constants. If we allow denominators (rational functions instead of polynomials), we can let F be the ratio of two homogeneous polynomials of the same degree. Alternatively, we can stick with polynomials and loosen the dependence on c, letting F(cv) = ckF(v). The solutions are then the homogeneous polynomials of degree . On the one hand, these form a finite dimensional vector space for each k, and on the other, if we let k vary, we can find the numerators and denominators for constructing all the rational functions which are really functions on the underlying projective space P(V).

One might ask, since the homogeneous polynomials are not really functions on P(V), what are they, geometrically speaking? The algebro-geometric answer is that they are sections of a sheaf (one could also say a line bundle in this case). The situation with modular forms is precisely analogous.

Modular forms can also be profitably approached from this geometric direction, as sections of line bundles on the moduli space of elliptic curves.

Rings of modular forms

Such rings of modular forms are generated in weight at most 6 and the relations are generated in weight at most 12 when the congruence subgroup has nonzero odd weight modular forms, and the corresponding bounds are 5 and 10 when there are no nonzero odd weight modular forms.

More generally, there are formulas for bounds on the weights of generators of the ring of modular forms and its relations for arbitrary Fuchsian groups.

Types

Entire forms
If f is holomorphic at the cusp (has no pole at q = 0), it is called an entire modular form.

If f is meromorphic but not holomorphic at the cusp, it is called a non-entire modular form. For example, the j-invariant is a non-entire modular form of weight 0, and has a simple pole at i∞.

New forms

New forms are a subspace of modular forms of a fixed weight  which cannot be constructed from modular forms of lower weights  dividing . The other forms are called old forms. These old forms can be constructed using the following observations: if  then  giving a reverse inclusion of modular forms .

Cusp forms

A cusp form is a modular form with a zero constant coefficient in its Fourier series. It is called a cusp form because the form vanishes at all cusps.

Generalizations 
There are a number of other usages of the term "modular function", apart from this classical one; for example, in the theory of Haar measures, it is a function  determined by the conjugation action.

Maass forms are real-analytic eigenfunctions of the Laplacian but need not be holomorphic. The holomorphic parts of certain weak Maass wave forms turn out to be essentially Ramanujan's mock theta functions. Groups which are not subgroups of  can be considered.

Hilbert modular forms are functions in n variables, each a complex number in the upper half-plane, satisfying a modular relation for 2×2 matrices with entries in a totally real number field.

Jacobi forms are a mixture of modular forms and elliptic functions. Examples of such functions are very classical - the Jacobi theta functions and the Fourier coefficients of Siegel modular forms of genus two - but it is a relatively recent observation that the Jacobi forms have an arithmetic theory very analogous to the usual theory of modular forms.

Automorphic forms extend the notion of modular forms to general Lie groups.

Modular integrals of weight  are meromorphic functions on the upper half plane of moderate growth at infinity which fail to be modular of weight  by a rational function.

Automorphic factors are functions of the form  which are used to generalise the modularity relation defining modular forms, so that

The function  is called the nebentypus of the modular form. Functions such as the Dedekind eta function, a modular form of weight 1/2, may be encompassed by the theory by allowing automorphic factors.

History

The theory of modular forms was developed in four periods: first in connection with the theory of elliptic functions, in the first part of the nineteenth century; then by Felix Klein and others towards the end of the nineteenth century as the automorphic form concept became understood (for one variable); then by Erich Hecke from about 1925; and then in the 1960s, as the needs of number theory and the formulation of the modularity theorem in particular made it clear that modular forms are deeply implicated.

The term "modular form", as a systematic description, is usually attributed to Hecke.

Notes

References 

 Leads up to an overview of the proof of the modularity theorem.
. Provides an introduction to modular forms from the point of view of representation theory.

. Chapter VII provides an elementary introduction to the theory of modular forms.
. Provides a more advanced treatment.

See also 
 Wiles's proof of Fermat's Last Theorem

 
Analytic number theory
Special functions